The China Policy Institute (CPI) is a research centre in the School of Politics and International Relations, University of Nottingham, that is focused on various aspects of contemporary China. It has a remit to disseminate policy relevant insights from academic research and to actively engage policymakers, society and business actors. The CPI works closely with the Foreign and Commonwealth Office and other stakeholders. It also publishes an online magazine CPI: Analysis.

Established in 2004, the CPI is committed to impartial and timely analysis of China, drawing on a network of Internal and Non-Resident Senior Fellows, China experts in a broad range of fields, including the economy, environment, politics, law, foreign policy, military, society and culture as well as Taiwan and Hong Kong.

The Director of the China Policy Institute is Jonathan Sullivan. Former Directors include Richard Pascoe, currently Executive Director of the Great Britain China Centre, and Steve Tsang, current Director of the SOAS China Institute.

See also
China–United Kingdom relations

References

External links
 
 China Policy Institute: Analysis
 China Policy Institute Blog (old)

Foreign policy and strategy think tanks based in the United Kingdom
University of Nottingham
China-focused think tanks